Disjoint may refer to:
Disjoint sets, sets with no common elements
Mutual exclusivity, the impossibility of a pair of propositions both being true

See also
Disjoint union
Disjoint-set data structure